The Himachal State Museum is a cultural museum located in Shimla, in the Indian state of Himachal Pradesh.

The museum was established in 1974 in Inverarm, a house at the top of Inverarm Hill that during the British Raj was the hot season residence of Lord William Beresford (and frequently used for overflow guests at the Viceroy's house in Shimla, Peterhoff, which was smaller), and subsequently of Edwin Henry Hayter Collen and then Edward FitzGerald Law. It was built out into a large Victorian house in the 1860s. The state of Himachal Pradesh acquired it to house the museum and renovated in 1973.

The collection includes wood carvings, bronzes, archaeological artefacts, coins, jewellery, manuscripts, paintings including many miniatures, postage stamps, and weapons.

References

External links 
 
 Official website

Museums in Himachal Pradesh
Buildings and structures in Shimla
1974 establishments in Himachal Pradesh
British-era buildings in Himachal Pradesh